The Székely Land football team is a team representing Székely Land, a historic and ethnographic region in eastern Transylvania, in central Romania, inhabited mainly by the Székelys, a subgroup of the Hungarian people. It is a member of ConIFA, an umbrella association for states, minorities, stateless peoples and regions unaffiliated with FIFA.

Székelyföld Labdarugó Egyesület

The Székelyföld Labdarugó Egyesület is the football association of Székely Land.

History

The association named Székelyföld Labdarugó Egyesület was founded in 2013 at Budapest, Hungary on the initiative of Kristóf Wenczel, a sports lawyer by profession. In January 2014, the Székelyföld Labdarugó Egyesület was admitted to the N.F.-Board, an organisation consisting of teams that represent nations, dependencies, unrecognized states, minorities, stateless peoples, regions and micronations not affiliated to FIFA. After the N.F.-Board became defunct later the same year, the Székelyföld Labdarugó Egyesület became member of the newly founded ConIFA.

Tournament records

ConIFA World Football Cup record

ConIFA European Football Cup record

Current squad

The following players were called up for the 2019 CONIFA European Football Cup.

Notable former players
The footballers enlisted below have played for Székely Land at least at one ConIFA World Football Cup or ConIFA European Football Cup and have had played at the top level.

 Balázs Csiszér
 Csaba Csizmadia
 István Fülöp
 Lóránd Fülöp

 Róbert Ilyés
 Szabolcs Kilyén
 László Szőcs

Managers

The following managers have been the head coach of Székely Land at least at one ConIFA World Football Cup or ConIFA European Football Cup.

 Róbert Ilyés
 József Gazda
 Zoltán Jakab

References 

CONIFA member associations
European national and official selection-teams not affiliated to FIFA
Sport in Romania
Székely Land
Hungarian minorities in Europe